A mushroom kiosk is a kiosk in the shape of a fly agaric. Mushroom kiosks were common in West Germany and Austria in the 1950s. They were originally designed to sell milk and dairy products, under the name Milchpilz.

Background 
The Wirtschaftswunder of the 1950s was reflected in the regained prosperity. Since alcohol wasn't available until the age of 21, it was considered fashionable to meet in milk bars and ice cream parlors. At the same time in Germany, dairies and their products were in competition with new soft drinks, which could be bought easily and conveniently at every kiosk. Milk, however, lacked such outlets.

This supply gap was to be closed with the idea of a milk kiosk, which would sell a wide range of milk products. The first kiosk in the shape of a fly agaric mushroom was presented as a so-called "milk consumer advertiser" at the "metropolitan dairy industry" conference in May 1952 in Bayreuth, and was later brought to Regensburg. Later, the manufacturer, Hermann Waldner KG from Wangen im Allgäu, had both the design and the name "mushroom kiosk" protected by law. Because a milk kiosk should have a high recognition value, Hermann Waldner's son Anton, who was the managing director of the time, chose the striking shape of a fly agaric mushroom.

The building itself was a prefabricated wooden structure painted white. In its original form, the kiosks had a flexible, water-repellent roof made of polyvinyl chloride (trade name: mipolam, now known as PVC). The roof was the characteristic red colour with white spots. In the course of the fading and structural aging of the soft PVC there was considerable shrinkage, so that some were soon re-roofed with a large metal structure and then painted in a similar style.

Milk mushrooms had a total height of around 4 metres and a roof width of 4.6 metres. The diameter of the interior space measured 3.15 metres. It was equipped with four sliding windows, a glass door, three built-in tables, and four shelves. A built-in refrigerator, whipped cream dispenser, and an ice cream machine could be purchased as additional standard equipment.

However, there was resistance from the authorities: in a letter dated 12 August 1952, the Württemberg State Office for Nature Conservation and Landscape Management in Ludwigsburg wrote to the management of Waldner: "I think the design of your little milk houses in the shape of a mushroom is completely absurd. The rejection of this structure, which would be more appropriate for America, by the city building authorities would be fine. I don't believe it takes a mushroom to make milk drinks popular. Reliable service and low prices will do more than tasteless advertising."

The mushrooms were not only sold in Germany, but also exported throughout Europe to Austria, Switzerland, Italy, France, Belgium and Greece.

The last item in the Waldner KG order book is number 49: delivery took place on 21 November 1958 to Mannheim.

Locations 
To this day, there are still eight kiosks in operation:

Other surviving Waldner-mushrooms or mushroom kiosks are of unclear status:

Miniature version 

These "mushrooms" also became popular through miniature versions produced by the Faller company, which specialises in model railways. The model for the HO scale has been in the catalogue since 1961.

Sources 

Buildings and structures by shape
Kiosks
Retail formats
Restaurants by type